The White House of the Confederacy was the executive residence of President Jefferson Davis and family while the capital of the Confederate States of America was in Montgomery, Alabama. Completely furnished with original period pieces from the 1850s and 1860s, the 1835 Italianate-style house is open to the public. It has been listed on the National Register of Historic Places since 1974 and the Alabama Register of Landmarks and Heritage since 2012.

Layout 

The White House of the Confederacy was a large two story wooden frame house painted white and green in Montgomery, Alabama. It had five bays across its frontal facade and four on either side. The main section of the house had a one-story wing extending from its rear, upon which two end-exterior chimneys were positioned. It was built on a foundation of brick piers and had a heavy bracketed cornice encircling the hipped roof. The cornice was unique in that it had a ventilation system ornamented with a Liberty cap design. A similar cornice could be found upon the rear one-story wing but with a flower design instead of the Liberty Cap one. The exterior walls are weather-boarded. The house had a portico in the center of its facade supported by fluted columns and a balustrade. In the portico area, the wall was built with wooden planks built to simulate a stone texture. The central entrance was framed with two pilasters with side lights. A transom built with an architrave was placed above the door. The central stairhall had access to a double parlor, two bedrooms, and a back hallway. The parlors had simple wooden doorways and were connected by sliding doors. The bedrooms were designed in a similar fashion. The hallway ended in an archway that was built with Greek revival doorways and an elaborate cornice design surrounding the roof of the doorway. The back hall which intersected with the main hallway had access to a side porch. The side porch was connected to the dining room through a hinged window that doubled as a door. The second floor had four bedrooms and what was most likely a nursery.

History
The Confederate White House is thought to have been built in 1825 by William Sayre, one of Montgomery's merchants. Afterward, the house passed into the possession of Col. J. G. Winter who remodeled it and afterward sold it to Col. Edmond Harrison of nearby Prattville, Alabama. In February 1861, shortly after selecting Davis as president, the Provisional Confederate Congress, meeting in Montgomery, authorized the leasing of an executive mansion. An offer came from Harrison, who offered to rent the house fully furnished and staffed for $5,000 per year. But after the Davises asked for extra furnishings of silver and linen, another $987 were added to the price of the lease. Additional furnishings were brought from the Davises’ own house in Biloxi, Mississippi. During the Davises’ stay at this house, they threw many lavish parties and entertainments. The first of these was held by Mrs. Davis for ladies of Montgomery. Records of the events say that they were both lavish and also well-managed. On May 27, 1861, they vacated the house and moved to the house in Richmond. When the capital moved from Montgomery to Richmond, the Confederate government sold the lease on the house. After the Civil War the house passed on to William Crawford Gibb and then eventually to the Tyson family in 1871.

Current status
The White House of the Confederacy survived the war, and passed through the hands of a number of private owners, until the United Daughters of the Confederacy began planning to take it over, but progress was halting until the foundation of the White House Association of Alabama in 1900, which took over the project. The owner was unwilling to sell the land on which the house stood and the organization did not have the funding to move it. By 1919, with the help of $25,000 from the Alabama legislature, the White House Association bought the house and moved it; by 1921 it was restored on its present location.

Alabama taxpayers subsidize the First White House with $100,000 per year, which led to criticism in 2017 from various groups and individuals including Alabama State Senator Hank Sanders, who took issue with the history of Alabama and the ideology of the Lost Cause of the Confederacy which they say was perpetuated by the displays and materials in the house, and the fact that slavery as an issue leading to the American Civil War seems to play no part in the historical presentation in the house.

References

External links

 

1861 establishments in Alabama
American Civil War museums in Alabama
Government of the Confederate States of America
Historic house museums in Alabama
Houses completed in 1835
Houses in Montgomery, Alabama
Houses on the National Register of Historic Places in Alabama
Italianate architecture in Alabama
Jefferson Davis
Lost Cause of the Confederacy
Montgomery, Alabama in the American Civil War
Museums in Montgomery, Alabama
National Register of Historic Places in Montgomery, Alabama